The 32nd Filmfare Awards were held in 1985.

Sharaabi led the ceremony with 11 nominations, followed by Aaj Ki Awaaz and Saaransh with 7 nominations and Sohni Mahiwal and Sparsh with 5 nominations each.

Saaransh, Sohni Mahiwal and Sparsh won 3 awards each, thus becoming the most-awarded films at the ceremony.

This year, the trend backed away from Parallel Cinema as more commercial films won awards.

Shabana Azmi received dual nominations for Best Actress for her performances in Bhavna and Sparsh, winning for the former.

Main awards

Best Film
 Sparsh 
Aaj Ki Awaaz
Jaane Bhi Do Yaaro
Saaransh
Sharaabi

Best Director
 Sai Paranjpye – Sparsh 
Kundan Shah – Jaane Bhi Do Yaaro
Mahesh Bhatt – Saaransh
Prakash Mehra – Sharaabi
Ravi Chopra – Aaj Ki Awaaz

Best Actor
 Anupam Kher – Saaransh 
Amitabh Bachchan – Sharaabi 
Dilip Kumar – Mashaal
Naseeruddin Shah – Sparsh
Raj Babbar – Aaj Ki Awaaz

Best Actress
 Shabana Azmi – Bhavna 
Jaya Prada – Sharaabi
Rohini Hattangadi – Saaransh
Shabana Azmi – Sparsh
Smita Patil – Aaj Ki Awaaz

Best Supporting Actor
 Anil Kapoor – Mashaal 
Danny Denzongpa – Kanoon Kya Karega
Nikhil Bhagat – Hip Hip Hurray
Shafi Inamdar – Aaj Ki Awaaz
Suresh Oberoi – Ghar Ek Mandir

Best Supporting Actress
 Aruna Irani – Pet Pyaar Aur Paap 
Rehana Sultan – Hum Rahe Naa Hum
Rohini Hattangadi – Bhavna
Sharmila Tagore – Sunny
Soni Razdan – Saaransh

Best Comic Actor
 Ravi Baswani – Jaane Bhi Do Yaaro 
Dada Kondke – Tere Mere Beech Mein
Ravi Baswani – Ab Aayega Mazaa
Satish Shah – Jaane Bhi Do Yaaro
Shakti Kapoor – Tohfa

Best Story
 Saaransh – Mahesh Bhatt 
Aaj Ki Awaaz – Shabd Kumar
Ghar Ek Mandir – Gyaan Dev Agnihotri
Mashaal – Javed Akhtar
Mohan Joshi Hazir Ho! – Sudhir Mishra

Best Screenplay
 Khandhar – Mrinal Sen

Best Dialogue
 Sparsh – Sai Paranjpye

Best Art Direction
 Saaransh – Madhukar Shinde

Best Cinematography
 Jaag Utha Insaan – P. L. Raj

Best Editing
 Sohni Mahiwal – M.S. Shinde

Best Sound
 Sohni Mahiwal – Brahmanand Sharma

Best Music Director 
 Sharaabi – Bappi Lahiri 
Jawaani – R.D. Burman
Kasam Paida Karne Wale Ki – Bappi Lahiri
Sohni Mahiwal – Anu Malik
Tohfa – Bappi Lahiri

Best Lyricist
 Aaj Ki Awaaz – Hasan Kamal for Aaj Ki Awaaz 
Sharaabi – Anjaan and Prakash Mehra for Inteha Ho Gayi
Sharaabi – Anjaan for Manzilain Apni Jagah Hain
Sohni Mahiwal – Anand Bakshi for Sohni Chinab Di
Tohfa – Indeevar for Tohfa Tere Pyaar Ka

Best Playback Singer, Male
 Sharaabi – Kishore Kumar for Manzilein Apni Jagah Hain 
Sharaabi – Kishore Kumar for De De Pyaar De
Sharaabi – Kishore Kumar for Inteha Ho Gayi
Sharaabi – Kishore Kumar for Log Kehte Hain

Best Playback Singer, Female
 Sohni Mahiwal – Anupama Deshpande for Sohni Chinab Di 
Kasam Paida Karne Wale Ki – Salma Agha for Jhoom Jhoom Baba

Critics' Awards

Best Film
 Damul

Best Documentary
 Charakku

Most Wins
Sparsh – 3/5
Sohni Mahiwal – 3/5
Saaransh – 3/7
Sharaabi – 2/11 
Aaj Ki Awaaz – 1/7

See also
 34th Filmfare Awards
 Filmfare Awards

References 

https://www.imdb.com/event/ev0000245/1985/

Filmfare Awards
Filmfare